Hiroyuki Fujikake (born 1949), also known by his pen name Hiro Fujikake, is a Japanese composer, conductor and synthesizer player.

Life 
Hiro Fujikake was born in 1949 in Gifu Prefecture, Japan. In 1964 he began his musical studies at the High School. Later he attended the Aichi Prefectural University of Fine Arts and Music in Aichi where he studied composition for four years to complete his bachelor's degree. He studied a further three years to get the Master of Music at the same university.

Fujikake has won numerous awards for his compositions.
Such as the Ongaku-no-tomo Composition Prize for "Two Poems for Chorus" in 1970.
The second prize of the NHK Mainichi Music Competition for "Threnody" in 1974.
The All Japan Band Association's Test Piece Composition Prize for "Concertino Overture" in 1975.
The Japan Mandolin Union Composition Prize for "Pastoral Fantasy" in 1975.
The first prize at the Sasagawa competition for "Nostalgic Rhapsody" in 1975 and "Chaconne" in 1976.
Japan Symphony Foundation's Composition Prize for "The Song of Spring" in 1990.
The Grand Prix at the Queen Elisabeth Music Competition in Belgium for the symphonic work "The Rope Crest" in 1977.

His compositional artwork is characterized by a wide variety of symphonies to operas on ballets, musicals, works for concert band, mandolin orchestra and traditional Japanese instruments, working for the radio, the television, film and for special occasions such as exhibitions such as World Design Exhibition in 1989 in Nagoya.

Besides composer he is also a performing artist of the synthesizer in his solo band named as "Solo Orchestra", which is a synthesizer orchestra directed and controlled by Hiro Fujikake alone assisted by computer. But usually he is accompanied by Japanese taiko drummers, singer, chorus, violinist, flutist, mandolin players, and musicians on Chinese musical instruments, etc.

Along with the flutist James Galway, he has recorded two CDs; the CD The Enchanted Forest was recorded in 1990 in the United States spent five months in the Billboard Top 10 of the Classical crossover section. He is a member of the Project Committee of the Nippon Music Foundation.

Style 
His works present a union of Eastern and Western music. Sometimes he integrates jazz and rock music. Natural elements (such as water sounds) also appear in his works.

Compositions

Orchestral works 
 1974 Threnody
 1977 The Rope Crest
 1988 The Spirit of Nature 
 1989 Hiroshima Spirit – As The Life of the New World
 1990 The Song of Spring
 1993 Gifu, a symphony for orchestra with Japanese taiko drums
 2003 Spring Sprung
 2004 Izumo, a symphony for orchestra and synthesizer
 Andante Moderato Maestoso "Beginning"
 Andante cantabile con espressione "Love and Love"
 Allegro con fuoco "Encounter"
 Moderato Maestoso "Soar to the World"

Works for band 
 1975 Concertino Overture
 1975 Nostalgic Rhapsody
 1976 Concert Overture
 1976 Chaconne
 1983 Hakuho Rhapsody
 1991 Rock'n March
 (Hakuhou Rhapsody)

Ballets 
 1988 Ah! Nomugi Toge

Musicals 
 1995 A Tale of Little Lives
 1999 Bunna

Choral music 
 1970 Two Poems for Chorus
 1989 Hiroshima Spirit – As The Life of the New World for mixed choir, flute solo and orchestra

Works for guitar 
 1999 Capriccio Sakura for guitar orchestra

Works for mandolin orchestra 
 1974 Merchen No.1
 1975, Pastoral Fantasy
 1976 Merchen No.2
 1976 Barades 8
 1977 Jhongara pour l'orchester de Mandolins
 1978 Stabat Mater
 1978 Poetical 2 pieces
 1979 Serenade No.1
 1979 Serenade No.2
 1981 Grand Chaconne
 1981 Ode for Spring
 1982 Goh: A Chance Meeting for mandolin orchestra and Japanese taiko drums
 1983 Variations on "The Moon over the Ruined Castle"
 1984 Ode for Dawn
 1989 Song of Lives
 1990 Tre Pick Prelude
 1990 Angel Chorus
 1994 Viva! Mandolin
 1995 Muse Concerto
 1995 Fantasia Kyushu
 1996 Stars concerto
 1998 Calling from Underground
 1999 Capriccio Sakura
 1999 Forest Symphony
 1999 Aqua Rhythm
 2001 Suite from the opera "Song of Papermaking Girls"
 Suite from the opera "Sun Legend (The Vanished Sun)"

Electronic music 
 1979 Galactic Symphony
 Prelude
 Allegro
 Adagio
 Allegro Scherzando
 Passacaglia
 1984 Romance
 1989 Synthesizer Fantasy
 1992 Lotusland in the Sky for orchestra (keyboard and computer)
 1998 Full Blooming for orchestra (keyboard and computer)
 2000 Wings to Eternity for orchestra (keyboard and computer)

References

External links 

1949 births
20th-century classical composers
20th-century Japanese composers
20th-century Japanese male musicians
21st-century classical composers
21st-century Japanese composers
21st-century Japanese male musicians
Japanese classical composers
Japanese electronic musicians
Japanese male classical composers
Living people
Musicians from Gifu Prefecture
Aichi Prefectural University of the Arts alumni
Prize-winners of the Queen Elisabeth Competition